Genophantis leahi was a species of moth in the family Pyralidae described by Otto Herman Swezey in 1910. It was endemic to the Hawaiian islands of Maui, Oahu, Molokai and Hawaii.

The wingspan was usually 20 mm or less.

The larvae fed on Euphorbia bifida, Euphorbia cordata, Euphorbia hirta and Euphorbia pilulifera. The larvae hid in a web spun between adjacent leaves and along the stem. They ate one surface and mesophyll of the leaf, leaving the other epidermis. Fully grown larvae were about 15 mm long and light yellowish, with blackish stripes.

The pupa was formed in a slight cocoon amongst the leaves on the ground. It was about 8 mm long and pale yellowish brown.

See also
 List of extinct animals of the Hawaiian Islands
 List of recently extinct insects

References

Sources
 

Phycitinae
Endemic moths of Hawaii
Extinct Hawaiian animals
Moths described in 1910
Extinct insects since 1500
Taxonomy articles created by Polbot